Ian David Hunter (born 11 September 1979) is an English cricketer. He is a right-handed batsman and a right-arm medium-fast bowler.

Hunter first played for Durham during the 1997 Second XI Championship, taking a wicket in a draw against Hampshire's Second XI.  He played consistently in the Second XI for six years.  Hunter was released by Durham in 2003 and played briefly for Cumberland in the Minor Counties Championship Eastern Division, before being given a two-year contract by Derbyshire.

Hunter is colourblind  and has admitted he finds playing cricket indoors to be a struggle.

In 1999 Hunter played in three youth Test matches against Australia Under-19s.

References

1979 births
Living people
English cricketers
Durham cricketers
Derbyshire cricketers
People from Sacriston
Cricketers from County Durham
Durham Cricket Board cricketers
Cumberland cricketers
Northumberland cricketers